Show Me the Money (SMTM; Korean: 쇼미더머니) is a South Korean rap competition TV show that airs on Mnet. The show has thus far released two compilation albums.

Compilation albums

Show Me the Money

Show Me the Money 2

Show Me the Money 3

Show Me the Money 4

Show Me the Money 5

Show Me the Money 6

Show Me the Money 777

Show Me the Money 8

Show Me the Money 9

Show Me the Money 10

Show Me the Money 11

See also
 Unpretty Rapstar discography

References

Show Me the Money (South Korean TV series)
Discographies of South Korean artists
Hip hop discographies